Warlock of the Stonecrowns is an adventure module for the Birthright campaign setting in the 2nd edition of the Advanced Dungeons & Dragons fantasy role-playing game.

Plot summary
In Warlock of the Stonecrowns, an adventure recommended for a party of four to six characters of levels four to ten, the Warlock - a scion of the awnshegh Gorgon - is building an army in his Citadel in the Stonecrown mountains, and plans to wreak vengeance on his father by conquering or extorting alliances from neighboring domains. Various adventure hooks are provided, in addition to the player characters' need to investigate the sudden depletion of realm magic sources in domains adjacent to the Stonecrowns, as the Warlock is accumulating realm magic with the aid of an enchanted cauldron to further his evil scheme. Each stage of the Warlock's scheme is detailed in a four-year chart, allowing the characters to approach the adventure piecemeal, coming back whenever they have gains sufficient experience to face the next hazard.

Parties travelling to the citadel overland are likely to encounter the Warlock's army, while parties that find an underground network of caves and passages to get there may experience several encounters along the way. Suggestions are given for each of the routes to the citadel, with the details left for the referee to fill in.

This citadel is described in great detail, and is filled with the Warlock's minions and his magical traps. The adventure gives the personality and behavior of each group and important NPC. There is also an adjacent shadow world, which uses the same map as the citadel proper; characters that enter this shadow world can gain valuable information and may have some powerful foes.

The adventure climaxes with a showdown between the heroes and the Warlock. The module outlines the deals he is prepared to make and the certain circumstances in which he is prepare to make and under which he'll stick to his word.

Publication history
Warlock of the Stonecrowns was written by Wolfgang Baur and published by TSR in 1995.

Reception
Cliff Ramshaw reviewed Warlock of the Stonecrowns for Arcane magazine, rating it an 8 out of 10 overall. Ramshaw had felt that too many Birthright adventures, "overly concerned with issues of nobility and politics, suffer from vagueness or over-linear plotting, but not this one. This one boasts action aplenty." He found the various hooks into the adventure were "all compelling", but felt that "the most likely is the players' need to investigate the sudden depletion of realm magic sources". He found that the Warlock's citadel "is pretty much as you'd expect (there's only so much originality you can apply to this sort of thing, after all) but is augmented by the Warlock's fiendish magical traps". He considered the shadow world an "interesting innovation" and felt that the encounters there were "some truly horrific foes". He called the Warlock "a bit of a monster" but noted that "in certain circumstances he's prepared to deal". Ramshaw concluded his review by saying: "This is an open-ended adventure blessed with a great deal of design attention, proving that detail is not inimical to freedom and that there's plenty of life left in the 'us chaps against the darklord' plot."

Reviews
Dragon #233

References

Birthright (campaign setting) adventures
Role-playing game supplements introduced in 1995